The middle cardiac vein commences at the apex of the heart. It passes posteriorly along the inferior interventricular sulcus to end at the coronary sinus near the sinus' termination.

Structure

Origin 
The middle cardiac vein commences at the cardiac apex (here, it is contiguous with the great cardiac vein, thus forming - along with the coronary sinus - a complete venous circle).

Variation 
The middle cardiac vein has a constant location on the surface of the ventricles.

Clinical significance 
The middle cardiac vein is useful for epicardial access to the inferior side of the ventricles.

References

External links
  - "Posterior view of the heart."

Veins of the torso